Madamba, officially the Municipality of Madamba (Maranao: Inged a Madamba), is a 4th class municipality in the province of Lanao del Sur, Philippines. According to the 2020 census, it has a population of 22,050 people.

History
Madamba belong to Nine Princess of Unayan (e.g.in Meranao term Andong so Macadar, Angkulan so Bita, Sanaulan so Dago-ok, Oyuda so Madamba, Inuda so Ganassi, Ayor so Linindingan, Tungon so Kadinguilan, Engkini so Tubaran, Borowa so Pagayawan, Dadauba so Biabi, etc.)

( Royal Sultanate of Madamba )
• Decendant of Datu
• Decendant of Barua ( Sultanate of Datinogaan )
• Decendant of LawaGuinda ( Royal House of Rajah Moda of Madamba )

Geography

Barangays
Madamba is politically subdivided into 24 barangays.

Climate

Demographics

Economy

References

External links
 Madamba Profile at the DTI Cities and Municipalities Competitive Index
 [ Philippine Standard Geographic Code]
 Philippine Census Information

Municipalities of Lanao del Sur
Populated places on Lake Lanao